The western red colobus (Piliocolobus badius), also known as the bay red colobus, rust red colobus or Upper Guinea red colobus, is a species of Old World monkey in West African forests from Senegal to Ghana. All other species of red colobuses have formerly been considered subspecies of P. badius. It is often hunted by the common chimpanzee. In 1994, western red colobus monkeys infected many chimpanzees with Ebola virus when the chimpanzees hunted the monkeys as prey.

Subspecies
According to Groves (2005) the Western red colobus has three subspecies, including the nominate:
 Bay red colobus, Piliocolobus badius badius
 Temminck's red colobus, Piliocolobus badius temminckii
 Miss Waldron's red colobus, Piliocolobus badius waldronae

P. b. waldronae is critically endangered, possibly even extinct. The other two subspecies are endangered.  Under more recent taxonomies, these are generally considered separate species.  Groves concurs with this revision, although not all primatologists agree.

Description
It has red or chestnut-brown head and limbs and black, slatey-grey or dark brown upper parts. It does not have long fringes of hair, or tufts of hair on the tail. Compared to monkeys in the genus Colobus, the nostrils are V-shaped, the digits are long and the big toe short.

Distribution and habitat
The red colobus is endemic to tropical West Africa. Its range includes various fragmentary populations in Sierra Leone, and contiguous populations in Liberia, Guinea and western Ivory Coast. It is unclear exactly where the ranges of P. b. badius and P. b. temminckii meet, but P. b. badius populations are separated from P. b. waldronae by the Bandama River in Ivory Coast. The red colobus is an arboreal species, typically found in primary rainforest, but also inhabiting secondary forest and gallery forest.

Ecology
The red colobus lives in colonies of between twelve and eighty members. There are usually several males and up to three times this number of adult females. There is a social hierarchy, giving access to food, space and grooming.

References

External links

 ARKive - images and movies of the Red colobus (Procolobus badius)

western red colobus
Ebola
Mammals of West Africa
Endangered fauna of Africa
western red colobus
Primates of Africa
Taxa named by Robert Kerr (writer)